USS Orvetta (IX–157) was built for the US Shipping Board as Tampa in 1920 by the Oscar Daniels Co., Tampa, Fla. and acquired by the United States Navy on a bareboat charter from the Maritime Commission 4 April 1944. She was renamed Orvetta and converted for military service as a barracks ship by the Matson Navigation Co., San Francisco; and commissioned 7 June 1944.

By 18 June Orvetta had reported for duty with Service Force, Pacific. She operated first with ServRon 8, headquartered at Pearl Harbor. Then, as the war moved west and north from the south Pacific, she shifted to ServRon 10 to provide housing facilities at advanced bases. By the end of the war she was in the Philippines, anchored in San Pedro Bay.

Following the signing of the official surrender documents, Orvetta steamed north to Okinawa, thence to Shanghai, arriving 30 September. Arriving at Subic Bay 18 May she continued to serve as, a barrack ship until decommissioned at the end of the year.

Struck from the Naval Register 10 June 1947, she was returned to the Maritime Commission, at Subic, 26 January 1948. Four months later she departed for the United States and was sold for scrap in early 1949.

References

External links
USS Orvetta

 

Design 1027 ships
Ships built in Tampa, Florida
1920 ships
Design 1027 ships of the United States Navy
Unclassified miscellaneous vessels of the United States Navy
World War II auxiliary ships of the United States
Ships built by the Oscar Daniels Shipbuilding Company